Radio Fusion Radio is the debut album by rap group, the College Boyz. It was released on April 7, 1992 through Virgin Records. The album found some success, making it to #118 on the Billboard 200, #25 on the Top R&B/Hip-Hop Albums and #2 on the Top Heatseekers, as did three singles released from the album. Both "Hollywood Paradox" and "Humpin" found decent success on the Hot Rap Singles chart, at #19 but the most successful was "Victim of the Ghetto", which peaked at #68 on the Billboard Hot 100, #28 on the Hot R&B/Hip-Hop Singles & Tracks and #4 on the Hot Rap Singles.

Track listing
"Victim of the Ghetto"- 4:53  
"Interlude 1: Radio Fusion Radio"- :28  
"Hollywood Paradox"- 3:45  
"Politics of a Gangster"- 3:53  
"Underground Blues"- 3:22  
"Interlude 2: The Homeless"- :52  
"Rigmarole"- 3:13  
"Interlude 3: After These Messages"- :05  
"Interlude 4: Peter Pump"- :53  
"Interlude 5: I Gotcha"- :39  
"Humpin'"- 5:03  
"Interlude 6: Phone Sex"- :33  
"College Boyz in the House"- 3:45  
"Interlude 7: Concerned Parent"- :09  
"Real Man"- 3:59  
"Interlude 8: Highroller Parade"- :32  
"How Ta Act"- 3:15  
"Interlude 9: Tips of the Day"- 1:08  
"Funky Quartet of the Day"- 3:19  
"Interlude 10: Who the Fuck Is This?"- :38  
"Politics of a Gangster Dub"- 4:14

Samples
"Hollywood Paradox"
"Impeach the President" by The Honey Drippers
"For the Love of You (Part 1 & 2)" by The Isley Brothers
"Humpin'"
"Humpin'" by The Gap Band
"Interlude: Peter Pump"
"Boogie Oogie Oogie" by A Taste of Honey
"Interlude: Phone Sex"
"(If Loving You Is Wrong) I Don't Want to Be Right" by Luther Ingram
"Underground Blues"
"Seven Minutes of Funk" by The Whole Darn Family
"Good Times" by Chic
"Atomic Dog" by George Clinton
"Victim of the Ghetto"
"The Newness Is Gone" by Eddie Kendricks
"Politics of a Gangster"
"Gangsta Gangsta" by N.W.A
"Politics of a Gangster Dub"
"B-Boy Bouillabaisse" by Beastie Boys
"Rigmarole"
"Impeach the President" by The Honey Drippers

Charts

Weekly charts

Year-end charts

Singles chart awards
Victim of The Ghetto

Hollywood Paradox

Humpin

References

1992 debut albums
College Boyz albums
Virgin Records albums